Karin Adelsköld, (born 15 July 1973) is a Swedish stand-up comedian and television presenter. She won "Best Swedish female stand-up comedian of the year" at the 2012 Swedish stand-up gala. In 2013, she presented "Alla tiders hits" on SVT along with Niklas Strömstedt.

References

External links
Official website

1973 births
Swedish women comedians
Swedish television hosts
Living people
Swedish women television presenters
21st-century Swedish comedians